Bill Godbout (October 2, 1939 – November 8, 2018) was an early computer pioneer and entrepreneur known for manufacturing and selling computer equipment, parts, and electronic kits in Silicon Valley, during the 1970s and 1980s.

He and his company, Godbout Electronics (and later CompuPro and Viasyn), were very influential in the early years of the personal computer market. Together with George Morrow, he worked on the IEEE696 (withdrawn) better known as the very popular S-100 bus.

He is featured in the book The Silicon Boys, 1999 by David A. Kaplan about the pioneers of Silicon Valley.

Early life
He was born on October 2, 1939 in Providence, Rhode Island.

Career

After college, he went straight into a job at IBM, but found himself "involuntarily recalled" to active military duty in 1961 and subsequently spending most of the 1960s in the military, being discharged in 1968. Deciding not to return to a big company, although still holding IBM in esteem, he moved to the San Francisco Bay area to assist in turning around a company in financial difficulties, an operation which concluded successfully. With the same team, he subsequently founded another business in Oakland, California and, after selling this business, enjoyed a period of semi-retirement until a friend, Mike Quinn, introduced him to the electronics surplus business in which he became fascinated. In 1973, he established Godbout Electronics in the San Francisco Bay area, out of a Quonset hut at Oakland International Airport. The New York Times called it a "popular electronics store." According to the Vintage Computer Federation, he was "a legend in the S-100 community for his 1970s-1980s work at Godbout Electronics and CompuPro."

For his store, he purchased bulk discarded electronics largely from military suppliers. Godbout "sold chips and memory boards by mail and did business with developers on a handshake basis."

After renaming the company CompuPro, he worked with George Morrow to develop the S-100 data bus, the IEEE-696. The S-100 bus was sold as part of the Altair 8800 kit machine.

Godbout manufactured S-100 compatible cards, which "formed the backbone of early systems like the Altair 8800 and homebrew machines, allowing techies to interface their processors and memory with peripherals and form useful microcomputers."

In the 1980s, Godbout focused on networking and moved his company, renamed Viasyn, to Hayward, California. He was chairman of the business. Viasyn focused on custom computing equipment for “things like medical offices, the early electronic music scene, and even niche areas like elevator control systems."

Personal life and death
Near the end of his life, he lived in the community of Concow, California with his wife Karen. The couple had a daughter, Brandi. Godbout was a keen pilot, and would often fly planes with his friend Gary Kildall.

Godbout was killed on November 8, 2018 when the Camp Fire burned down his home and workshop in Concow. He was survived by his wife and daughter.

References

External links

American computer specialists
1939 births
2018 deaths
Deaths from fire in the United States